Ruth Eckerd Hall is a  performing arts venue, located in Clearwater, Florida, in the Tampa Bay area and is part of the Richard B. Baumgardner Center for the Performing Arts.

The concert hall is named after Ruth Eckerd, the wife of businessman Jack Eckerd, and is a regular performance venue for the Florida Orchestra.

Its 2,180-seat auditorium features continental seating, with no center aisle.

History
In 1977, the Kapok Tree Corporation donated  to the City of Clearwater with the stipulation that a performing arts center be built on the property. The bequest mandated that the construction begin within two years, and in 1979 a ground breaking ceremony was held. At its inception, a group of dedicated volunteers in the community stepped forward to organize the effort and obtain the necessary resources for its completion. Among these leaders, Jack and Ruth Eckerd were instrumental in the project's success. The main auditorium is named in Mrs. Eckerd's honor. The center's main name recognizes Richard B. Baumgardner, the founder of the Kapok Tree Corporation.  The facility is a Frank Lloyd Wright inspired building with Taliesin Associated Architects, led by William Wesley Peters doing the design work.
Construction cost $14.5 million with $9 million donated by the private sector and the remaining $5.5 million provided in the form of a mortgage.  The Hall was dedicated and opened on October 15, 1983.

Created to own, manage and maintain the land and the facility, Ruth Eckerd Hall, Inc. is a non-profit presenting organization, while the Ruth Eckerd Hall Foundation, Inc. obtains funding for debt retirement and the ongoing operation of the center.

Each year, over 350,000 adult and young audience members visit Ruth Eckerd Hall for performances ranging from world-renowned classical artists and dance companies to Broadway musicals and pop stars. Through its many arts education programs, the education department of Ruth Eckerd Hall serves nearly 100,000 students and adults annually.

The commitment of the Board of Directors of both organizations and the management staff is to continue to present the finest performing arts and provide educational opportunities in the performing arts to all segments of the community.

Noted performers

Alison Krauss and Union Station
The B-52's
Backstreet Boys
Boston
Carole King
Don Henley
Fiona Apple
Foreigner
Four Tops
Heart
Herbie Hancock
Jason Mraz
Jewel
Josh Groban
Lyle Lovett
The Monkees
Paramore
Paul Anka
Ringo Starr & His All-Starr Band
Tom Jones
Van Morrison
Wilco

See also
 Jack Eckerd

External links

References

Concert halls in Florida
Buildings and structures in Clearwater, Florida
Music venues in Florida
Theatres in Florida
Tourist attractions in Pinellas County, Florida
1983 establishments in Florida
Event venues established in 1983